The 2nd Central Bureau of the Chinese Communist Party (Traditional Chinese: 中共第二中央局) was the first such bureau to be convened within the 2nd Central Executive Committee of the Chinese Communist Party. It was held in 1922. It was not preceded by a Central Bureau in 1921, as that concept had not developed yet, but all bodies met all at once in the 1st National Congress of the Chinese Communist Party. This Central Bureau was followed by the more foundational 3rd Central Bureau of the Chinese Communist Party. In 1925, it started to be known as the politburo.

References

History of the Chinese Communist Party